This is a list of former oceans that disappeared due to tectonic movements and other geographical and climatic changes. In alphabetic order:

List
 Bridge River Ocean, the ocean between the ancient Insular Islands (that is, Stikinia) and North America
 Cache Creek Ocean, a Paleozoic ocean between the Wrangellia Superterrane and Yukon-Tanana Terrane
 Iapetus Ocean, the Southern hemisphere ocean between Baltica and Avalonia
 Kahiltna-Nutotzin Ocean, Mesozoic
 Khanty Ocean, the Precambrian to Silurian ocean between Baltica and the Siberian continent
 Medicine Hat Ocean
 Mezcalera Ocean, the ocean between the Guerrero Terrane and Laurentia
 Mirovia, the ocean that surrounded the Rodinia supercontinent
 Mongol-Okhotsk Ocean, the early Mesozoic ocean between the North China and Siberia cratons
 Oimyakon Ocean, the northernmost part of the Mesozoic Panthalassa Ocean
 Paleo-Tethys Ocean, the ocean between Gondwana and the Hunic terranes
 Pan-African Ocean, the ocean that surrounded the Pannotia supercontinent
 Panthalassa, the vast world ocean that surrounded the Pangaea supercontinent, also referred to as the Paleo-Pacific Ocean
 Pharusian Ocean, Neoproterozoic
 Poseidon Ocean, Mesoproterozoic
 Pontus Ocean, the western part of the early Mesozoic Panthalassa Ocean
 Proto-Tethys Ocean, Neoproterozoic
 Rheic Ocean, the Paleozoic ocean between Gondwana and Laurussia
 Slide Mountain Ocean, the Mesozoic ocean between the ancient Intermontane Islands (that is, Wrangellia) and North America
 South Anuyi Ocean, Mesozoic ocean related to the formation of the Arctic Ocean
 Tethys Ocean, the ocean between the ancient continents of Gondwana and Laurasia
 Thalassa Ocean, the eastern part of the early Mesozoic Panthalassa Ocean
 Ural Ocean, the Paleozoic ocean between Siberia and Baltica

See also

 :Category:Historical oceans
 
 
 
 
 , an ocean that surrounds a global supercontinent
 

ancient oceans
ancient oceans
Historical oceans
Mesozoic paleogeography
Paleozoic paleogeography
Proterozoic paleogeography